Rappa Ternt Sanga is the debut studio album by American rapper and singer T-Pain, it was released on December 6, 2005. The title is an eye dialect of the phrase "rapper turned singer."

One of the leftover tracks from the album was, titled "You and Me"; which is the original version of "I Can't Wait" by Akon. The remix to "Studio Luv" was made featuring Lil Wayne. The remix to "Dance Floor" was made featuring Pitbull.

Critical reception

Andy Kellman of AllMusic stated that "Had there been limited use of studio tricks and more guidance, Rappa Ternt Sanga would've been a more-than-respectable debut. Christian Hoard of Rolling Stone said that "Rappa Ternt Sanga too often drifts into loverman tedium, but a handful of slower cuts are saved by T-Pain's R. Kelly-worthy gift for not holding back".

Commercial performance 
Rappa Ternt Sanga debuted at number 40 on the US Billboard 200 chart, selling 47,000 copies in the first week. In its second week, the album fell to number 94 on the chart. Over the following weeks the album eventually climbed to its peak at number 33 on the chart. On March 9, 2006, the album was certified gold for shipments of over 500,000 copies in the United States.

The album spawned two top 10 singles on the US Billboard Hot 100 with "I'm Sprung" and "I'm 'n Luv (Wit a Stripper)", which peaked at number eight and number five respectively.

Track listing
Credits adapted from the album's liner notes.

Charts

Weekly charts

Year-end charts

Certifications

References

2005 debut albums
T-Pain albums
Jive Records albums
Albums produced by T-Pain